Florin Lucian Petcu (born 2 April 1976) is a Romanian former professional footballer who played as a forward for teams such as FCM Bacău, Național București or F.C. Ashdod, among others. After retirement, Petcu worked as a kids trainer at Sporting Bacău, then in 2017 he opened his own football school Kids 2017 Bacău.

Honours
Petrolul Moinești
Divizia C: 1995–96
FCM Bacău
Cupa Ligii: 1998

References

External links
 

1976 births
Living people
Sportspeople from Bacău
Romanian footballers
Association football forwards
Liga I players
Liga II players
Liga III players
FCM Bacău players
CSM Focșani players
FC Progresul București players
FC Vaslui players
Israeli Premier League players
F.C. Ashdod players
Romanian expatriate footballers
Romanian expatriate sportspeople in Israel
Expatriate footballers in Israel